Charles Griffin (December 18, 1825 – September 15, 1867) was a career officer in the United States Army and a Union general in the American Civil War. He rose to command a corps in the Army of the Potomac and fought in many of the key campaigns in the Eastern Theater.

After the war, he commanded the Department of Texas during Reconstruction. He was an ardent supporter of the Congressional policies of the Radical Republicans and of freedmen's rights, and controversially disqualified a number of antebellum state officeholders in Texas, replacing them with loyal Unionists.

Early life and career
Griffin was born in Granville, Ohio, the son of Apollos Griffin. He attended the nearby Kenyon College in Gambier, and graduated from the U.S. Military Academy in West Point, New York, placing 23rd out of 38 in the Class of 1847. Commissioned as a brevet second lieutenant, he served with the 2nd U.S. Artillery during the final campaign of the Mexican–American War.

He was promoted to first lieutenant in 1849 and served in the New Mexico Territory against Navajo Indians until 1854, when he left the Southwest frontier. He then taught artillery tactics at West Point, forming an artillery battery from the academy's enlisted men shortly after the Southern states began seceding from the Union.

Civil War

Captain Griffin led the "West Point Battery" (officially designated as Battery D, 5th U.S. Artillery) at the First Battle of Bull Run in July 1861. He received a brief furlough from the army and married Sallie Carroll, the scion of a prominent Maryland family, on December 10, 1861.

Griffin commanded his battery during the early part of the 1862 Peninsula Campaign. He was promoted to brigadier general of volunteers on June 12, 1862, to rank from June 9, 1862, and assigned command of a brigade of infantry. He served with distinction at Gaines's Mill and Malvern Hill. During the Second Battle of Bull Run, his brigade was held in reserve. His men were also lightly engaged at the Battle of Antietam. Griffin's irascibility frequently led to conflict with his superiors, but his leadership abilities brought steady promotion.

Assigned command of a division in the V Corps, he served at the Battle of Fredericksburg and during the Chancellorsville Campaign. Stricken with illness, he turned over command of the division to a subordinate and did not accompany it during the early part of the Gettysburg Campaign. Arriving as the Battle of Gettysburg was winding down, his return was widely celebrated by his men. The popular officer led the division throughout the year, including during the Mine Run Campaign. Griffin participated in most of the major battles of the Army of the Potomac in 1864, including the Overland Campaign and Siege of Petersburg. On December 12, 1864, President Abraham Lincoln nominated Griffin for appointment as a brevet major general of volunteers, to rank from  August 1, 1864, and the United States Senate confirmed the appointment on February 14, 1865.

Griffin assumed command of V Corps during its final campaign and was present when Robert E. Lee surrendered at Appomattox Court House. In August, he was assigned command of the district of Maine, with his headquarters in Portland.

On July 12, 1865, Griffin was appointed major general of volunteers to rank from April 2, 1865. On July 17, 1866, President Andrew Johnson nominated Griffin for appointment as a brevet major general in the regular army, to rank from  March 13, 1865, for his service at the Battle of Five Forks and the United States Senate confirmed the appointment on July 23, 1866.

Postbellum
After the war, Griffin's rank reverted to colonel in the regular army, in command of the 35th U.S. Infantry. He briefly commanded the Department of Maine before being sent west to Galveston, Texas. He served as assistant commissioner of the Freedmen's Bureau for Texas in 1867, serving under Philip H. Sheridan.

He became entangled in political issues and registered both black and white voters under the Reconstruction Acts in the spring of that year. He strictly enforced the ironclad oath of allegiance (forcing men to publicly swear that they had never served the Confederacy) as the basis for jury selection. Dissatisfied with the performance of appointed Governor James W. Throckmorton, Griffin persuaded General Sheridan to remove him from office and replace him with a Republican and loyal Unionist, Elisha M. Pease. Together, they used their power and position to remove several Democratic antebellum state officeholders who had supported the Confederacy, replacing them with other Unionists.

Griffin was assigned command of the Fifth Military District, replacing Sheridan, and was ordered to report to New Orleans. However, before he could leave for Louisiana and his new headquarters, he died in an epidemic of yellow fever that swept through southeast Texas. He is buried at Oak Hill Cemetery in Washington, D.C.

Fort Griffin on the Texas frontier was later named in his honor.

See also

 List of American Civil War generals (Union)

Notes

References
 Eicher, John H., and Eicher, David J., Civil War High Commands, Stanford University Press, 2001, .

External links

 Antietam on the Web
 History Central
 

1825 births
1867 deaths
Deaths from yellow fever
People from Granville, Ohio
United States Military Academy alumni
United States Army colonels
American military personnel of the Mexican–American War
People of Ohio in the American Civil War
Union Army generals
Texas in the American Civil War
Infectious disease deaths in Texas
Kenyon College alumni
Texas Republicans
Burials at Oak Hill Cemetery (Washington, D.C.)